Eunidia quadrialbosignata is a species of beetle in the family Cerambycidae. It was described by Stephan von Breuning in 1965. It is known from the Democratic Republic of the Congo.

References

Eunidiini
Beetles described in 1965
Endemic fauna of the Democratic Republic of the Congo